Cwej: Down the Middle is a 2020 science-fiction anthology published by Arcbeatle Press, with contributions from various authors, including the creator of Chris Cwej, Andy Lane, and was edited by Hunter O'Connell. It is the first installment in Cwej: The Series, and is an officially licensed spin-off of the multi-media series Doctor Who.

The anthology features the return of Chris Cwej, a companion of the Doctor from the Virgin New Adventures series, as well as the character of Iris Wildthyme. Elements from the Arcbeatle series 10,000 Dawns would also appear.

It received mostly positive reviews from critics, who praised it for its strong writing and stories, with some comparisons being made to the Faction Paradox series, another spin-off of Doctor Who.

Stories

Production
The project was devised as an anthology and multiple writers were commissioned to participate in the project, including those who had written for Doctor Who before, such as Simon Butcher Jones and Andy Lane. James Hornby, who wrote for the UNIT spin-off series, also was tapped to write a story.

Editor Hunter O'Connell noted in a retrospective that the character of Cwej was, "like a puppy who was saved from a dog fight", stating that the intention of the anthology was to present Cwej's journey to return to where he was. O'Connell also described the series as a passion project and described Cwej as, "Philosophically complex and motivated by truth".

Originally, The PsyCon Prediction was to be called Cwej and the Thief, but this was changed before publication.

Stories A Bright White Crack and Collective Unconscious were released online for free to promote the anthology.

In a Reddit AMA, Andy Lane described his story as being inspired by TV show, The X-Files.

Various pieces of original artwork were created by Bri Crozier, Mia Ashford-John, Brian Gorman, Emmeryn Telemain Reed, Callum and Stuart Brown, Dawn Rushim, Derek Dodebier, Newt Griffin, and Johannes Chazot.

Reprint
The book was given a reprint in 2023, featuring a new cover with updated corrections to the original version.

Reception
Jon Arnold of We Are Cult stated that, "Down the Middle is a hugely promising start to the Cwej range: Rich in character and creative reimagining of older ideas to provide fresh perspectives and significant moral dilemmas with ongoing consequences for its characters."

Lupan Evezan, creator of the series The Crew of the Copper-Colored Cupids, praised the anthology, calling it, "A wonderful continuation of the story of Chris Cwej".

Actress Katy Manning, who played Jo Grant in Doctor Who, and also portrayed the character of Iris Wildthyme, would promote the book on her Twitter account.

Sequels
In the press release for the second edition of Down the Middle, writer James Hornby noted that, "The team at Arcbeatle have big plans for Cwej, and it all begins with Down the Middle".

Two anthology sequels, Hidden Truths, and Seasons, are scheduled to be released at an undetermined date.

According to a tweet made by Blood and the Stars and 10,000 Dawns writer Aidan Mason, he will be contributing a story to the Seasons anthology.

A comic, featuring the likeness of Travis Oliver, is also in the works.

References

External links

2020 anthologies
Doctor Who spin-offs
Science fiction anthologies